"Sei solo tu" is a song written by Cheope and Nek and recorded by Italian singers Nek and Laura Pausini for Nek's seventh studio album, Le cose da difendere. The song was released on 10 May 2002 as the album's lead single.

The Spanish version of the album, Las cosas que defenderé, also includes a Spanish-language version of the song, titled "Tan sólo tú" and released as a single in Spain, South America, and in the United States.

Nek also included a solo version of the song in his compilation albums The Best of Nek: L'anno zero and Greatest Hits 1992–2010: E da qui.

Composition
During an interview released to Italian newspaper Corriere della Sera, Nek described the song as "a clear love declaration between a boy and a girl, told with very simple words and music".

Track listing
CD single – "Sei solo tu"
 "Sei solo tu" (feat. Laura Pausini) – 3:18
 "Sei solo tu" (Instrumental version) – 3:19
 "En el tren" – 3:56

CD single – "Tan sólo tú"
 "Tan sólo tú" (Album version)
 "Tan sólo tú" (Radio edito)
 "Tan sólo tú" (Extended Club Mix)

Personnel

Music credits
 Cheope – composer
 Paolo Costa – bass
 Riccardo Galardini – acoustic guitar
 Alfredo Golino – drums
 Nek – vocals, composer
 Dado Parisini – keyboards, grooves, vocal arrangements
 Laura Pausini – vocals
 Massimo Varini – acoustic guitar, electric guitar

Production credits
 Dado Parisini – producer
 Alfredo Cerruti – producer
 Nek – producer
 Renato Cantele – engineer
 Carlo Enrico – assistant
 Gebriele Gigli – assistant
 Matteo Bolzoni – assistant
 Matteo Rovatti – assistant

Charts

Weekly charts

Year-end charts

Release history

References

2002 singles
Italian-language songs
Spanish-language songs
Laura Pausini songs
Nek songs
Songs written by Nek
Songs written by Cheope